The renewable-energy industry is the part of the energy industry focusing on new and appropriate renewable energy technologies. Investors worldwide have paid greater attention to this emerging industry in recent years. In many cases, this has translated into rapid renewable energy commercialization and considerable industry expansion. The wind power, solar power and hydroelectric power industries provide good examples of this.

In 2020, the global renewable energy market was valued at $881.7 billion  and consumption grew 2.9 EJ. China was the largest contributor to renewable growth, accounting an increment of 1.0 EJ in consumption, followed by the US, Japan, the United Kingdom, India, and Germany. In Europe, renewable consumption incremented 0.7 EJ.

Overview
Net-zero and 100% renewable energy global goals create market opportunities for renewable industries such as solar and wind energy and lithium-ion batteries. By 2050, it’s estimated that the renewable market will reach a value of one trillion dollars, the same size as the current oil market.

In 2020, renewable sources incorporated into energy consumption at its fastest rate in two decades.

During 2006/2007, several renewable energy companies went through high profile initial public offerings (IPOs), resulting in market capitalization near or above $1 billion. These corporations included the solar PV companies First Solar (USA), Trina Solar (USA), Centrosolar (Germany), and Renesola (U.K.), wind power company Iberdrola (Spain), and U.S. biofuels producers VeraSun Energy, Aventine, and Pacific Ethanol.

Renewable energy industries expanded during most of 2008, with large increases in manufacturing capacity, diversification of manufacturing locations, and shifts in leadership. By August 2008, there were at least 160 publicly traded renewable energy companies with a market capitalization greater than $100 million. The number of companies in this category has expanded from around 60 in 2005. 

Some $150 billion was invested in renewable energy globally in 2009, including new capacity (asset finance and projects) and biofuels refineries. This is more than double the 2006 investment figure of $63 billion. Almost all of the increase was due to greater investment in wind power, solar PV, and biofuels.

In 2000, venture capital (VC) investment in renewable energy was about 1% of total VC investment. In 2007 that figure was closer to 10%, with solar power alone making up about 3% of the entire Venture Capital asset class of ~$33B. More than 60 start-ups have been funded by
VCs in the last three years. Venture capital and private equity investments in renewable energy companies increased by 167 percent in 2006, according to investment analysts at New Energy Finance Limited.

New investment into the sector jumped US$148 billion in 2007, up 60 per cent over 2006, noted a report by the Sustainable Energy Finance Initiative (SEFI). Wind energy attracted one-third of the new capital and solar one-fifth. But interest in solar is growing rapidly on the back of major technological advances which saw solar investment increase 254 per cent. The IEA predicts US$20 trillion will be invested into alternative energy projects over the next 22 years.

Wind power
In 2020, wind power accounted for more than six percent of global electricity with 743 GW of global capacity. In the same year, 93 GW capacity was installed. For reach a 'net zero' emission status, the world needs to install at least 180 GW of new wind energy capacity by year.

Companies

Vestas was the largest wind turbine manufacturer in the world with and 16% market share in 2020. The company operates plants in Denmark, Germany, India, Italy, Britain, Spain, Sweden, Norway, Australia and China, and employs more than 20,000 people globally. After a sales slump in 2005, Vestas recovered and was voted Top Green Company of 2006.

In 2020, Siemens Gamesa was the world's second largest wind turbine manufacturer in 2020 thank to its position in the offshore sector of India. The company lead the offshore wind market.

Other major wind power companies include GE Power, Suzlon, Sinovel and Goldwind.

Wind potential 
Africa's onshore wind energy potential is calculated  of almost 180,000 Terawatt hours (TWh) per annum, which is able to satisfy the electricity demands of the continent 250 times over. In 2009, a technical study by the Wind Energy Technologies Office estimated that the onshore wind energy potential for the United States is 10,500 gigawatt (GW) capacity at 80 meters.

Photovoltaics

Trends

Solar production has been increasing by an average of some 20 percent each year since 2002, making it the world’s fastest-growing energy technology. At the end of 2009, the cumulative global PV installations surpassed 21,000 megawatts.

According to the China Greentech Report 2009, jointly issued by the PricewaterhouseCoopers and American Chamber of Commerce in Shanghai and released on 10 Sept in Dalian, China, the estimated size of China's green technology market could be between US$500 billion and US$1 trillion annually, or as much as 15 percent of China's forecasted GDP, in 2013. With the positive drivers from the Chinese government’s policies to develop green technology solution, China has already played a more important role in green technology market development. Following the announcements of the Chinese government in 2009 about the new subsidy scheme of “Golden Sun” to support solar industry development in China, some of the worldwide industry players have announced their development plans in this region, such as the agreement signed by LDK Solar regarding a solar project in Jiangsu province with a total capacity of 500MW, manufacturing facilities of polysilicon ingots and wafers, PV cells and PV modules to be built by Yingli Green Energy in Hainan Province, and the new thin film manufacturing plants of Tianwei Baoding and Anwell Technologies. In 2022, solar power market is expected to reach a value of $422 billion.

Companies 

In 2017, main manufacturers of photovoltaics cells are based in Asia. Nine out of twelve major companies are based in China. The manufacturer Jinko Solar was the leader company in the sector, with 9.86% of the market share, followed by Trina Solar, JA Solar, Canadian Solar and Hanwha Q-Cells.

Tengger Desert Solar Park is the largest solar park in the world, with a capacity of 1,547MW. The park is located in Zhongwei, Ningxia, and it's called the Great Wall of Solar.

Biofuels
Brazil continued its ethanol expansion plans which began in the 70's and now has the largest ethanol distribution and the largest fleet of cars run by any mix of ethanol and gasoline.

In the ethanol fuel industry, the United States dominated, with 130 operating ethanol plants in 2007, and production capacity of 26 billion liters/year (6.87 billion gallons/year), a 60 percent increase over 2005. Another 84 plants were under construction or undergoing expansion, and this will result in a doubled production capacity.
The biodiesel industry opened many new production facilities during 2006/2007 and continued expansion plans in several countries. New biodiesel capacity appeared throughout Europe, including in
Belgium, Czech Republic, France, Germany, Italy, Poland, Portugal, Spain, Sweden, and the United Kingdom.

Commercial investment in second-generation biofuels began in 2006/2007, and much of this investment went beyond pilot-scale plants. The world’s first commercial wood-to-ethanol plant began operation in Japan in 2007, with a capacity of 1.4 million liters/year. The first wood-to-ethanol plant in the United States is planned for 2008 with an initial output of 75 million liters/year.

Employment

Renewable energy use tends to be more labor-intensive than fossil fuels, and so a transition toward renewables promises employment gains. In 2019, 11.5 million people work either directly in renewables or indirectly in supplier industries. The wind power industry employs some 1.7 million people, the photovoltaic sector accounts for an estimated 3.7 million jobs, and the solar thermal industry accounts for about 820,000.  More than 3.58 million jobs are located in the biomass and biofuels sector.

See also

Clean Energy Trends
List of concentrating solar thermal power companies
List of countries by electricity production from renewable source
List of the largest hydroelectric power stations
List of large wind farms
List of solar thermal power stations
Symbiocity
Renewable-energy economy
Renewable energy policy
Renewable energy development
Sustainable industries
The Clean Tech Revolution
Clean Technology Fund
Green-collar worker

References

Bibliography

External links
 
 
 
 
 
 
 
 
 Global Renewable Drones Market.

Energy development
Energy economics
Green politics
Renewable energy commercialization
Renewable energy economy
Sustainable technologies
Industries (economics)